The Aberdeen Mound is a historic site in Aberdeen, Ohio, United States.  Located north of the village off State Route 41, it was listed on the National Register of Historic Places in 1974.

Historic uses 
Graves/Burials

References

See also
 List of burial mounds in the United States

Archaeological sites on the National Register of Historic Places in Ohio
Geography of Brown County, Ohio
Mounds in Ohio
National Register of Historic Places in Brown County, Ohio